Gucha District was a former district in Nyanza Province, western Kenya. It was also known by the name: South Kisii District or Ogembo District. In 1999, its population was approximately 461,000 . Its district headquarters were at Ogembo which houses more than a thousand residents, (people who live in the center of the town), with more than one thousand people more that visit it each day.

Agriculture is the main industry. Apart from numerous small family plantations, there are large sugar cane fields. The population is mostly Gusii, but the district borders Maasai land at southeast. There has been some ethnic clashes between them.

The district had three constituencies: South Mugirango, Bomachoge Borabu Constituency , Bomachoge Chache Constituency and Bobasi. At the 2002 General elections all three seats were won by FORD-People.

In 2010, the district was eliminated and merged into Kisii County.

External links

 Languages
Kisii Language - Kisii English- Ekegusii translation

 
Former districts of Kenya